Agnete Hegelund Hansen (born 10 March 1988) is a Danish fashion model.  She has modeled in fashion shows for designers Burberry Prorsum, Christian Lacroix, Diane von Fürstenberg, Dolce & Gabbana, Givenchy, Marni, among others.

Modeling career 
Hegelund was discovered while shopping in Copenhagen, Denmark, in November 2005, and signed with Ford Models that same month.  Two weeks later she appeared on her first cover for German Elle magazine.

In 2008 Hegelund was photographed several times by Steven Meisel, including the cover of Vogue Italia in February 2008. and advertising campaigns for Calvin Klein Ck Jeans, Pringle of Scotland, Anna Sui and Alberta Ferretti.

Hegelund appeared in the March 2011 British Harper's Bazaar editorial, photographed by Jonas Bresnan.

References

External links
 Portfolio at MetroModels.com
 
 
 

Danish female models
Living people
1991 births